The 1999 Senior British Open was a professional golf tournament for players aged 50 and above and the 13th British Senior Open Championship, held from 22 to 25 July at Royal Portrush Golf Club in Portrush, County Antrim, Northern Ireland, United Kingdom.

In 2018, the tournament was, as all Senior British Open Championships played 1987–2002, retroactively recognized as a senior major golf championship and a PGA Tour Champions (at the time named the Senior PGA Tour) event.

Christy O'Connor Jnr beat John Bland by three strokes and won his first of two Senior British Open titles.

Defending champion Brian Huggett finished tied 20th, 15 strokes from the back. Leading amateur was Roy Smethurst, tied 30th, 18 strokes from the winner.

Venue
The event was the fifth Senior Open Championship in a row held at Royal Portrush Golf Club.

Course layout

Source:

Field
123 players, 113 professionals and 10 amateurs, entered the competition.

55 players qualified through two 18-hole final qualifying tournaments, 26 players at Royal Portrusch Valley Links course and 29 players at nearby Castlerock Golf Club. They joined 68 players, who were exempt into the championship.

Five players withdraw and one was disqualified. 63 players made the 36-hole cut.

Past champions in the field
Seven past Senior British Open champions participated. Six of them made the 36-hole cut, Gary Player (3rd), Bob Charles (tied 5th), Brian Huggett (tied 20th), Brian Barnes (tied 27th), Neil Coles (tied 27th) and John Fourie (tied 30th). One of them, Bobby Verwey, withdraw.

Past winners and runners-up at The Open Championship in the field 
The field included three former winners of The Open Championship, Bob Charles (tied 5th), Gary Player (3rd) and Tony Jacklin (missed cut).

The field also included three former runners-up at The Open Championship; Brian Huggett (tied 20th), Neil Coles (tied 27th) and Christy O'Connor Snr (missed the cut).

Final results 
Sunday, 25 July 1999

Source:

References

External links 
 Results on European Tour website

Senior major golf championships
Golf tournaments in Northern Ireland
Senior British Open
Senior British Open
Senior British Open